Nationality words link to articles with information on the nation's poetry or literature (for instance, Irish or France).

Events
 Baptista Mantuanus' Eclogues prescribed for schoolboys studying Latin poetry in Braunschweig; at the same time, the work is used in schools in Nördlingen, Memmingen and Emmerich

Works published
 Anonymous, The Ploughman's tale, publication year uncertain; likely composed in the 15th century; misattributed to Chaucier in Thynne's edition of his works 1532
 Niccolò Carmignano, Operette del Parthenopeo Suavio, first book printed in Bari
 Gavin Douglas, publication year uncertain; written about 1501; an allegory presented as a vision
 Jacopo Sannazaro, an Italian writing here in Latin:
 almost 150 epigrams; published posthumously (died 1530)
 Elegies in three books, imitating Propertius and Tibullus
 Maurice Scève, a translation into French of the sequel by Juan de Flores to Boccaccio's Fiammetta
 Marco Girolamo Vida, Christiados libri sex ("The Christiad in Six Books"), a Latin epic poem begun by Vida, an Italian bishop, in the 1510s but not completed until the early 1530s

Births
Death years link to the corresponding "[year] in poetry" article:
 February 16 – Nicolas Rapin (died 1608), French magistrate, royal officer, translator, poet and satirist
 Also:
 Cyprian Bazylik (died 1600), Polish composer, poet, printer, and writer
 Martín del Barco Centenera (died c. 1602) Spanish cleric, explorer, author and poet
 Simwnt Fychan (died 1606), Welsh language poet and genealogist
 George Gascoigne (died 1577), English poet
 Arthur Golding (died 1606), English translator of prose and poetry; nothing known of him after this year
 Govindadasa (died 1613), Bengali Vaishnava poet known for his body of devotional songs addressed to Krishna
 Jasper Heywood (died 1598), English poet and translator
 Riccardo Luisini (died 1617), Italian, Latin-language poet
 Martin Rakovský (died 1579), Slovak
 Gioanni Hercolani de' Sarti, fl. at this time, Italian, Latin-language poet

Deaths
Birth years link to the corresponding "[year] in poetry" article:
 May 26 – Francesco Berni, (born 1497), Italian writer and poet
 August 27 – Lope de Vega died (born 1462), Spain
 September 25 – Johannes Secundus (born 1511), Dutch, Latin-language poet
 Also:
 Girolamo Angeriano, also known as "Hieronymus Angerianus" born sometime between about 1470 and about 1490, Italian, Latin-language poet; sources differ on his birth year, with some stating 1470, others giving c. 1480 and another c. 1490 
 Hieronymus Balbus, also called "Girolamo Balbi" and "Accellini", death year uncertain (born c. 1450), Italian Renaissance humanist, poet, diplomat, and bishop
 Pedro Manuel Jiménez de Urrea, (born 1486), Spanish Renaissance poet and playwright

See also

 Poetry
 16th century in poetry
 16th century in literature
 French Renaissance literature
 Renaissance literature
 Spanish Renaissance literature

Notes

16th-century poetry
Poetry